James Kay Turner (January 14, 1912 – June 22, 1995) was an American football center who played one season with the Cleveland Rams of the National Football League. He played college football at Oklahoma State University and attended Wichita Falls High School in Wichita Falls, Texas.

References

External links
Just Sports Stats

1912 births
1995 deaths
Players of American football from Oklahoma
American football centers
Oklahoma State Cowboys football players
Cleveland Rams players
People from Pontotoc County, Oklahoma